Ludrová is a village and municipality in Ružomberok District in the Žilina Region of northern Slovakia.

History
In historical records the village was first mentioned in 1376.

Geography
The municipality lies at an altitude of 565 metres and covers an area of 5.347 km². It has a population of about 982 people.

References

External links
https://web.archive.org/web/20060626023225/http://www.ludrova.sk/

Villages and municipalities in Ružomberok District